The International Criminal Court (ICC or ICCt) is an intergovernmental organization and international tribunal seated in The Hague, Netherlands. It is the first and only permanent international court with jurisdiction to prosecute individuals for the international crimes of genocide, crimes against humanity, war crimes and the crime of aggression. 

It is distinct from the International Court of Justice, an organ of the United Nations that hears disputes between states. While praised as a major step toward justice, and as an innovation in international law and human rights, the ICC has faced a number of criticisms from governments and civil society, including objections to its jurisdiction, accusations of bias, Eurocentrism and racism, questioning of the fairness of its case selection and trial procedures, and doubts about its effectiveness. 

The court has to date convicted only Africans. The African Union has encouraged African states to not work alongside the ICC. These leaders and political bodies said that “the ICC is acting as a neo-colonial force seeking to further empower Western political and extractive interests in Africa.”

History

Background 
The establishment of an international tribunal to judge political leaders accused of international crimes was first proposed during the Paris Peace Conference in 1919 following the First World War by the Commission of Responsibilities. The issue was addressed again at a conference held in Geneva under the auspices of the League of Nations in 1937, which resulted in the conclusion of the first convention stipulating the establishment of a permanent international court to try acts of international terrorism. The convention was signed by 13 states, but none ratified it and the convention never entered into force.

Following the Second World War, the allied powers established two ad hoc tribunals to prosecute Axis leaders accused of war crimes. The International Military Tribunal, which sat in Nuremberg, prosecuted German leaders while the International Military Tribunal for the Far East in Tokyo prosecuted Japanese leaders. In 1948 the United Nations General Assembly first recognised the need for a permanent international court to deal with atrocities of the kind prosecuted after World War II. At the request of the General Assembly, the International Law Commission (ILC) drafted two statutes by the early 1950s but these were shelved during the Cold War, which made the establishment of an international criminal court politically unrealistic.

Benjamin B. Ferencz, an investigator of Nazi war crimes after World War II and the Chief Prosecutor for the United States Army at the Einsatzgruppen trial, became a vocal advocate of the establishment of international rule of law and of an international criminal court. In his book Defining International Aggression: The Search for World Peace (1975), he advocated for the establishment of such a court. Another leading proponent was Robert Kurt Woetzel, a German-born professor of international law, who co-edited Toward a Feasible International Criminal Court in 1970 and created the Foundation for the Establishment of an International Criminal Court in 1971.

Formal proposal and establishment 
In June 1989, the Prime Minister of Trinidad and Tobago, A. N. R. Robinson, revived the idea of a permanent international criminal court by proposing the creation of tribunal to address the illegal drug trade. In response, the General Assembly tasked the ILC with once again drafting a statute for a permanent court. 

While work began on the draft, the UN Security Council established two ad hoc tribunals in the early 1990s: The International Criminal Tribunal for the former Yugoslavia, created in 1993 in response to large-scale atrocities committed by armed forces during the Yugoslav Wars, and the International Criminal Tribunal for Rwanda, created in 1994 following the Rwandan genocide. The creation of these tribunals further highlighted to many the need for a permanent international criminal court.

In 1994, the ILC presented its final draft statute for the International Criminal Court to the General Assembly and recommended that a conference be convened to negotiate a treaty that would serve as the Court's statute. 

To consider major substantive issues in the draft statute, the General Assembly established the Ad Hoc Committee on the Establishment of an International Criminal Court, which met twice in 1995. After considering the Committee's report, the General Assembly created the Preparatory Committee on the Establishment of the ICC to prepare a consolidated draft text.

From 1996 to 1998, six sessions of the Preparatory Committee were held at the United Nations headquarters in New York City, during which NGOs provided input and attended meetings under the umbrella organisation of the Coalition for the International Criminal Court (CICC). In January 1998, the Bureau and coordinators of the Preparatory Committee convened for an Inter-Sessional meeting in Zutphen in the Netherlands to technically consolidate and restructure the draft articles into a draft.

Finally, the General Assembly convened a conference in Rome in June 1998, with the aim of finalizing the treaty to serve as the Court's statute. On 17 July 1998, the Rome Statute of the International Criminal Court was adopted by a vote of 120 to seven, with 21 countries abstaining. The seven countries that voted against the treaty were China, Iraq, Israel, Libya, Qatar, the U.S., and Yemen. 

Israel's opposition to the treaty stemmed from the inclusion in the list of war crimes "the action of transferring population into occupied territory". 

The UN General Assembly voted on 9 December 1999 and again 12 December 2000 on to endorse the ICC.

Following 60 ratifications, the Rome Statute entered into force on 1 July 2002 and the International Criminal Court was formally established. 

The first bench of 18 judges was elected by the Assembly of States Parties in February 2003. They were sworn in at the inaugural session of the Court on 11 March 2003. 

The Court issued its first arrest warrants on 8 July 2005, and the first pre-trial hearings were held in 2006. 

The Court issued its first judgment in 2012 when it found Congolese rebel leader Thomas Lubanga Dyilo guilty of war crimes related to using child soldiers.

In 2010, the states parties of the Rome Statute held the first Review Conference of the Rome Statute of the International Criminal Court in Kampala, Uganda. The Review Conference led to the adoption of two resolutions that amended the crimes under the jurisdiction of the Court. Resolution 5 amended Article 8 on war crimes, criminalizing the use of certain kinds of weapons in non-international conflicts whose use was already forbidden in international conflicts. Resolution 6, pursuant to Article 5(2) of the Statute, provided the definition and a procedure for jurisdiction over the crime of aggression.

Organization

The ICC has four principal organs: the Presidency, the Judicial Divisions, the Office of the Prosecutor and the Registry. 

The President is the most senior judge chosen by his or her peers in the Judicial Division, which is composed of eighteen judges and hears cases before the Court. 

The Office of the Prosecutor is headed by the Prosecutor, who investigates crimes and initiates criminal proceedings before the Judicial Division. 

The Registry is headed by the Registrar and is charged with managing all the administrative functions of the ICC, including the headquarters, detention unit, and public defense office. 

The ICC employs over 900 personnel from roughly 100 countries and conducts proceedings in English and French.

Operation
The ICC began operations on 1 July 2002, upon the entry into force of the Rome Statute, a multilateral treaty that serves as the court's charter and governing document. States which become party to the Rome Statute become members of the ICC, serving on the Assembly of States Parties, which administers the court. As of March 2022, there are 123 ICC member states; 42 states have neither signed nor become parties to the Rome Statute. 

Intended to serve as the "court of last resort", the ICC complements existing national judicial systems and may exercise its jurisdiction only when national courts are unwilling or unable to prosecute criminals. It lacks universal territorial jurisdiction and may only investigate and prosecute crimes committed within member states, crimes committed by nationals of member states, or crimes in situations referred to the Court by the United Nations Security Council.

The ICC held its first hearing in 2006, concerning war crimes charges against Thomas Lubanga Dyilo, a Congolese warlord accused of recruiting child soldiers; his subsequent conviction in 2012 was the first in the court's history. The Office of the Prosecutor has opened twelve official investigations and is conducting an additional nine preliminary examinations. 

Dozens of individuals have been indicted in the ICC, including Ugandan rebel leader Joseph Kony, former President Omar al-Bashir of Sudan, President Uhuru Kenyatta of Kenya, Libyan head of state Muammar Gaddafi, President Laurent Gbagbo of Ivory Coast and former Vice President Jean-Pierre Bemba of the Democratic Republic of the Congo. 

On 17 March 2023, ICC judges issued an arrest warrant for Russian leader Vladimir Putin, for child abductions in the 2022 Russian invasion of Ukraine. 

Putin was the first head of state of a U.N. Security Council Permanent Member to be the subject of an ICC arrest warrant. (Russia withdrew its signature from the Rome Statute in 2016, and thus not a participant in the ICC, which therefore has no authority there. However, Putin can be charged for actions against a party and against Ukraine, which is not a party but accepts jurisdiction of the court since 2014. Should Putin travel to a state party, he can be arrested by local authorities.)

Opposition

United States
President George W. Bush signed the American Service-Members' Protection Act, (informally referred to as The Hague Invasion Act), to signify the United States' opposition to any possible future jurisdiction of the court or its tribunals. During the administration of Barack Obama, U.S. opposition to the ICC evolved to "positive engagement", although no effort was made to ratify the Rome Statute.

The subsequent Donald Trump administration was considerably more hostile to the Court, similar to the Bush administration threatening prosecution and financial sanctions on ICC judges and staff in U.S. courts as well as imposing visa bans in response to any investigation against American nationals in connection to alleged crimes and atrocities perpetrated by the U.S. in Afghanistan. The threat included sanctions against any of over 120 countries which have ratified the Court for cooperating in the process. In November 2017, Fatou Bensouda advised the court to consider seeking charges for human rights abuses committed during the War in Afghanistan such as alleged rapes and tortures by the U.S. Armed Forces and the Central Intelligence Agency, crime against humanity committed by the Taliban, and war crimes committed by the Afghan National Security Forces. John Bolton, National Security Advisor of the United States, stated that ICC Court had no jurisdiction over the U.S., which did not ratify the Rome Statute. In 2020, overturning the previous decision not to proceed, senior judges at the ICC authorized an investigation into the alleged war crimes in Afghanistan. 

In June 2020, the decision to proceed led the Trump administration to power an economic and legal attack on the court. "The US government has reason to doubt the honesty of the ICC. The Department of Justice has received substantial credible information that raises serious concerns about a long history of financial corruption and malfeasance at the highest levels of the office of the prosecutor", Attorney General William Barr said. The ICC responded with a statement expressing "profound regret at the announcement of further threats and coercive actions." "These attacks constitute an escalation and an unacceptable attempt to interfere with the rule of law and the Court's judicial proceedings", the statement said. "They are announced with the declared aim of influencing the actions of ICC officials in the context of the court's independent and objective investigations and impartial judicial proceedings."

On 30 September 2020, prominent United States human rights lawyers announced that they would sue Trump and his Administration—including Secretary of State Mike Pompeo, Treasury secretary Steven Mnuchin, attorney general William Barr, and OFAC director Andrea Gacki, and the departments they head—on the grounds that Trump's Executive Order 13928 order had gagged them, violating their right to free speech and impeding their work in trying to obtain justice on behalf of victims of war crimes. One of the plaintiffs, Diane Marie Amann, stated that, as a result of sanctions against the chief prosecutor at the ICC, she herself risked having her family assets seized if she continued to work for children who are bought and sold by traffickers, killed, tortured, sexually abused and forced to become child soldiers.

On 4 January 2021, U.S. District Judge Katherine Polk Failla in New York City issued a preliminary injunction against the Trump administration from imposing criminal or civil penalties against ICC personnel and those who support the court's work, including the plaintiffs.

African states
In October 2016, after repeated claims that the court was biased against African states, Burundi, South Africa and the Gambia announced their withdrawals from the Rome Statute. Following Gambia's presidential election later that year, which ended the long rule of Yahya Jammeh, Gambia rescinded its withdrawal notification. A decision by the High Court of South Africa in early 2017 ruled that the attempted withdrawal was unconstitutional, as it had not been agreed by Parliament, prompting the South African government to inform the UN that it was revoking its decision to withdraw.

Philippines
Following the announcement that the ICC would open a preliminary investigation on the Philippines in connection to its escalating drug war, President Rodrigo Duterte announced on 14 March 2018 that the Philippines would start to submit plans to withdraw, completing the process on 17 March 2019. The ICC pointed out that it retained jurisdiction over the Philippines during the period when it was a state party to the Rome Statute, from November 2011 to March 2019.

Russia
In March 2023, Dmitry Peskov announced that Russia did not recognize the Court's decision to issue an arrest warrant for President Vladimir Putin on account of war crimes in Ukraine.

Structure

The ICC is governed by the Assembly of States Parties, which is made up of the states that are party to the Rome Statute. The Assembly elects officials of the Court, approves its budget, and adopts amendments to the Rome Statute. The Court itself has four organs: the Presidency, the Judicial Divisions, the Office of the Prosecutor, and the Registry.

State parties

Assembly

The Court's management oversight and legislative body, the Assembly of States Parties, consists of one representative from each state party. Each state party has one vote and "every effort" has to be made to reach decisions by consensus. If consensus cannot be reached, decisions are made by vote. The Assembly is presided over by a president and two vice-presidents, who are elected by the members to three-year terms.

The Assembly meets in full session once a year, alternating between New York and The Hague, and may also hold special sessions where circumstances require. Sessions are open to observer states and non-governmental organizations.

The Assembly elects the judges and prosecutors, decides the Court's budget, adopts important texts (such as the Rules of Procedure and Evidence), and provides management oversight to the other organs of the Court. Article 46 of the Rome Statute allows the Assembly to remove from office a judge or prosecutor who "is found to have committed serious misconduct or a serious breach of his or her duties" or "is unable to exercise the functions required by this Statute".

The states parties cannot interfere with the judicial functions of the Court. Disputes concerning individual cases are settled by the Judicial Divisions.

In 2010, Kampala, Uganda hosted the Assembly's Rome Statute Review Conference.

Organs 
The Court has four organs: the Presidency, the Judicial Division, the Office of the Prosecutor, and the Registry.

Presidency

The Presidency is responsible for the proper administration of the Court (apart from the Office of the Prosecutor). It comprises the President and the First and Second Vice-Presidents—three judges of the Court who are elected to the Presidency by their fellow judges for a maximum of two three-year terms.

As of March 2021, the President is Piotr Hofmański from Poland, who took office on 11 March 2021, succeeding Chile Eboe-Osuji. His first term will expire in 2024.

Judicial Division

The Judicial Divisions consist of the 18 judges of the Court, organized into three chambers—the Pre-Trial Chamber, Trial Chamber and Appeals Chamber—which carry out the judicial functions of the Court. Judges are elected to the Court by the Assembly of States Parties. They serve nine-year terms and are not generally eligible for re-election. All judges must be nationals of states parties to the Rome Statute, and no two judges may be nationals of the same state. They must be "persons of high moral character, impartiality and integrity who possess the qualifications required in their respective States for appointment to the highest judicial offices".

The Prosecutor or any person being investigated or prosecuted may request the disqualification of a judge from "any case in which his or her impartiality might reasonably be doubted on any ground". Any request for the disqualification of a judge from a particular case is decided by an absolute majority of the other judges. Judges may be removed from office if "found to have committed serious misconduct or a serious breach of his or her duties" or is unable to exercise his or her functions. The removal of a judge requires both a two-thirds majority of the other judges and a two-thirds majority of the states parties.

Office of the Prosecutor

The Office of the Prosecutor (OTP) is responsible for conducting investigations and prosecutions. It is headed by the Prosecutor of the International Criminal Court, who is assisted by one or more Deputy Prosecutors. The Rome Statute provides that the Office of the Prosecutor shall act independently; as such, no member of the Office may seek or act on instructions from any external source, such as states, international organisations, non-governmental organisations or individuals.

The Prosecutor may open an investigation under three circumstances:
when a situation is referred to him or her by a state party;
when a situation is referred to him or her by the United Nations Security Council, acting to address a threat to international peace and security; or
when the Pre-Trial Chamber authorises him or her to open an investigation on the basis of information received from other sources, such as individuals or non-governmental organisations.

Any person being investigated or prosecuted may request the disqualification of a prosecutor from any case "in which their impartiality might reasonably be doubted on any ground". Requests for the disqualification of prosecutors are decided by the Appeals Chamber. A prosecutor may be removed from office by an absolute majority of the states parties if he or she "is found to have committed serious misconduct or a serious breach of his or her duties" or is unable to exercise his or her functions. One critic said there are "insufficient checks and balances on the authority of the ICC prosecutor and judges" and "insufficient protection against politicized prosecutions or other abuses". Luis Moreno-Ocampo, chief ICC prosecutor, stressed in 2011 the importance of politics in prosecutions: "You cannot say al-Bashir is in London, arrest him. You need a political agreement." Henry Kissinger says the checks and balances are so weak that the prosecutor "has virtually unlimited discretion in practice".

Lead prosecutor Luis Moreno Ocampo of Argentina, in office from 2003 to 2012, was succeeded in the role by Fatou Bensouda of Gambia, who served from 16 June 2012 to 16 June 2021 (she was elected to the nine-year term on 12 December 2011).

On 12 February 2021, British barrister Karim Khan was selected in a secret ballot against three other candidates to serve as lead prosecutor as of 16 June 2021. As British barrister, Khan had headed the United Nations' special investigative team when it looked into Islamic State crimes in Iraq. At the ICC, he had been lead defense counsel on cases from Kenya, Sudan and Libya.

Policy Paper
A Policy Paper is a document occasionally published by the Office of the Prosecutor which puts forth the considerations given to the topics the office focuses on, and often the criteria for case selection. While a policy paper does not give the Court jurisdiction over a new category of crimes, it promises what the Office of Prosecutor will consider when selecting cases in the upcoming term of service. OTP's policy papers are subject to revision.

The five following Policy Papers have been published since the start of the ICC:
1 September 2007: Policy Paper on the Interest of Justice
12 April 2010: Policy Paper on Victims' Participation
1 November 2013: Policy Paper on Preliminary Examinations
20 June 2014: Policy Paper on Sexual and Gender-Based Crimes
15 September 2016: Policy paper on case selection and prioritisation
15 November 2016: Policy on Children

Environmental crimes
The Policy Paper published in September 2016 announced that the ICC will focus on environmental crimes when selecting the cases. According to this document, the Office will give particular consideration to prosecuting Rome Statute crimes that are committed by means of, or that result in, "inter alia, the destruction of the environment, the illegal exploitation of natural resources or the illegal dispossession of land".

This has been interpreted as a major shift in environmental law and a move with significant effects.

Registry
The Registry is responsible for the non-judicial aspects of the administration and servicing of the Court. This includes, among other things, "the administration of legal aid matters, court management, victims and witnesses matters, defence counsel, detention unit, and the traditional services provided by administrations in international organisations, such as finance, translation, building management, procurement and personnel". The Registry is headed by the Registrar, who is elected by the judges to a five-year term. The previous Registrar was Herman von Hebel, who was elected on 8 March 2013. The current Registrar is Peter Lewis, who was elected on 28 March 2018.

Jurisdiction and admissibility 

The Rome Statute requires that several criteria exist in a particular case before an individual can be prosecuted by the Court. The Statute contains three jurisdictional requirements and three admissibility requirements. All criteria must be met for a case to proceed. The three jurisdictional requirements are (1) subject-matter jurisdiction (what acts constitute crimes), (2) territorial or personal jurisdiction (where the crimes were committed or who committed them), and (3) temporal jurisdiction (when the crimes were committed).

Process

The process to establish the Court's jurisdiction may be "triggered" by any one of three possible sources: (1) a State party, (2) the Security Council or (3) a Prosecutor. It is then up to the Prosecutor acting ex proprio motu ("of his own motion" so to speak) to initiate an investigation under the requirements of Article 15 of the Rome Statute. The procedure is slightly different when referred by a State Party or the Security Council, in which cases the Prosecutor does not need authorization of the Pre-Trial Chamber to initiate the investigation. Where there is a reasonable basis to proceed, it is mandatory for the Prosecutor to initiate an investigation. The factors listed in Article 53 considered for reasonable basis include whether the case would be admissible, and whether there are substantial reasons to believe that an investigation would not serve the interests of justice (the latter stipulates balancing against the gravity of the crime and the interests of the victims).

Subject-matter jurisdiction requirements 
The Court's subject-matter jurisdiction means the crimes for which individuals can be prosecuted. Individuals can only be prosecuted for crimes that are listed in the Statute. The primary crimes are listed in article 5 of the Statute and defined in later articles: genocide (defined in article 6), crimes against humanity (defined in article 7), war crimes (defined in article 8), and crimes of aggression (defined in article 8 bis) (which is not yet within the jurisdiction of the Court; see below). In addition, article 70 defines offences against the administration of justice, which is a fifth category of crime for which individuals can be prosecuted.

Genocide 
Article 6 defines the crime of genocide as "acts committed with intent to destroy, in whole or in part, a national, ethnical, racial or religious group". There are five such acts which constitute crimes of genocide under article 6:
 Killing members of a group
 Causing serious bodily or mental harm to members of the group
 Deliberately inflicting on the group conditions of life calculated to bring about its physical destruction
 Imposing measures intended to prevent births within the group
 Forcibly transferring children of the group to another group
The definition of these crimes is identical to those contained within the Convention on the Prevention and Punishment of the Crime of Genocide of 1948.

Crimes against humanity 
Article 7 defines crimes against humanity as acts "committed as part of a widespread or systematic attack directed against any civilian population, with knowledge of the attack". The article lists 16 such as individual crimes:

 Murder
Extermination
 Enslavement
 Deportation or forcible transfer of population
 Imprisonment or other severe deprivation of physical liberty
 Torture
 Rape
 Sexual slavery
 Enforced prostitution
 Forced pregnancy
 Enforced sterilization
 Sexual violence
 Persecution
 Enforced disappearance of persons
 Apartheid
 Other inhumane acts

War crimes 
Article 8 defines war crimes depending on whether an armed conflict is either international (which generally means it is fought between states) or non-international (which generally means that it is fought between non-state actors, such as rebel groups, or between a state and such non-state actors). In total there are 74 war crimes listed in article 8. The most serious crimes constitute either grave breaches of the Geneva Conventions of 1949, which only apply to international conflicts, and serious violations of article 3 common to the Geneva Conventions of 1949, which apply to non-international conflicts.

Eleven crimes constitute grave breaches of the Geneva Conventions and apply only to international armed conflicts:
 Willful killing
 Torture
 Inhumane treatment
 Biological experiments
 Willfully causing great suffering
 Destruction and appropriation of property
 Compelling service in hostile forces
 Denying a fair trial
 Unlawful deportation and transfer
 Unlawful confinement
 Taking hostages

Seven crimes constitute serious violations of article 3 common to the Geneva Conventions and apply only to non-international armed conflicts:
 Murder
 Mutilation
 Cruel treatment
 Torture
 Outrages upon personal dignity
 Taking hostages
 Sentencing or execution without due process

Another 56 crimes defined by article 8: 35 apply to international armed conflicts and 21 to non-international armed conflicts. Such crimes include attacking civilians or civilian objects, attacking peacekeepers, causing excessive incidental death or damage, transferring populations into occupied territories, treacherously killing or wounding, denying quarter, pillaging, employing poison, using expanding bullets, rape and other forms of sexual violence, and conscripting or using child soldiers.

Crimes of aggression 
Article 8 bis defines crimes of aggression. The Statute originally provided that the Court could not exercise its jurisdiction over the crime of aggression until such time as the states parties agreed on a definition of the crime and set out the conditions under which it could be prosecuted. Such an amendment was adopted at the first review conference of the ICC in Kampala, Uganda, in June 2010. This amendment specified that the ICC would not be allowed to exercise jurisdiction of the crime of aggression until two further conditions had been satisfied: (1) the amendment has entered into force for 30 states parties and (2) on or after 1 January 2017, the Assembly of States Parties has voted in favor of allowing the Court to exercise jurisdiction. On 26 June 2016 the first condition was satisfied and the state parties voted in favor of allowing the Court to exercise jurisdiction on 14 December 2017. The Court's jurisdiction to prosecute crimes of aggression was accordingly activated on 17 July 2018.

The Statute, as amended, defines the crime of aggression as "the planning, preparation, initiation or execution, by a person in a position effectively to exercise control over or to direct the political or military action of a State, of an act of aggression which, by its character, gravity and scale, constitutes a manifest violation of the Charter of the United Nations." The Statute defines an "act of aggression" as "the use of armed force by a State against the sovereignty, territorial integrity or political independence of another State, or in any other manner inconsistent with the Charter of the United Nations." The article also contains a list of seven acts of aggression, which are identical to those in United Nations General Assembly Resolution 3314 of 1974 and include the following acts when committed by one state against another state:

 Invasion or attack by armed forces against territory
 Military occupation of territory
 Annexation of territory
 Bombardment against territory
 Use of any weapons against territory
 Blockade of ports or coasts
 Attack on the land, sea, or air forces or marine and air fleets
 The use of armed forces which are within the territory of another state by agreement, but in contravention of the conditions of the agreement
 Allowing territory to be used by another state to perpetrate an act of aggression against a third state
 Sending armed bands, groups, irregulars, or mercenaries to carry out acts of armed force

Offences against the administration of justice 
Article 70 criminalizes certain intentional acts which interfere with investigations and proceedings before the Court, including giving false testimony, presenting false evidence, corruptly influencing a witness or official of the Court, retaliating against an official of the Court, and soliciting or accepting bribes as an official of the Court.

Territorial or personal jurisdiction requirements 
For an individual to be prosecuted by the Court either territorial jurisdiction or personal jurisdiction must exist. Therefore, an individual can only be prosecuted if he or she has either (1) committed a crime within the territorial jurisdiction of the Court or (2) committed a crime while being a national of a state that is within the territorial jurisdiction of the Court.

Territorial jurisdiction 
The territorial jurisdiction of the Court includes the territory, registered vessels, and registered aircraft of states which have either (1) become party to the Rome Statute or (2) accepted the Court's jurisdiction by filing a declaration with the Court.

In situations that are referred to the Court by the United Nations Security Council, the territorial jurisdiction is defined by the Security Council, which may be more expansive than the Court's normal territorial jurisdiction. For example, if the Security Council refers a situation that took place in the territory of a state that has both not become party to the Rome Statute and not lodged a declaration with the Court, the Court will still be able to prosecute crimes that occurred within that state.

Personal jurisdiction 
The personal jurisdiction of the Court extends to all natural persons who commit crimes, regardless of where they are located or where the crimes were committed, as long as those individuals are nationals of either (1) states that are party to the Rome Statute or (2) states that have accepted the Court's jurisdiction by filing a declaration with the Court. As with territorial jurisdiction, the personal jurisdiction can be expanded by the Security Council if it refers a situation to the Court.

Temporal jurisdiction requirements 

Temporal jurisdiction is the time period over which the Court can exercise its powers. No statute of limitations applies to any of the crimes defined in the Statute. This is not completely retroactive. Individuals can only be prosecuted for crimes that took place on or after 1 July 2002, which is the date that the Rome Statute entered into force. If a state became party to the Statute, and therefore a member of the Court, after 1 July 2002, then the Court cannot exercise jurisdiction prior to the membership date for certain cases. For example, if the Statute entered into force for a state on 1 January 2003, the Court could only exercise temporal jurisdiction over crimes that took place in that state or were committed by a national of that state on or after 1 January 2003.

Admissibility requirements 
To initiate an investigation, the Prosecutor must (1) have a "reasonable basis to believe that a crime within the jurisdiction of the Court has been or is being committed", (2) the investigation would be consistent with the principle of complementarity, and (3) the investigation serves the interests of justice.

Complementarity 
The principle of complementarity means the Court will only prosecute an individual if states are unwilling or unable to prosecute. Therefore, if legitimate national investigations or proceedings into crimes have taken place or are ongoing, the Court will not initiate proceedings. This principle applies regardless of the outcome of national proceedings. Even if an investigation is closed without any criminal charges being filed or if an accused person is acquitted by a national court, the Court will not prosecute an individual for the crime in question so long as it is satisfied that the national proceedings were legitimate. The application of the complementarity principle has recently come under theoretical scrutiny.

Gravity 
The Court will only initiate proceedings if a crime is of "sufficient gravity to justify further action by the Court".

Interests of justice 
The Prosecutor will initiate an investigation unless there are "substantial reasons to believe that an investigation would not serve the interests of justice" when "[t]aking into account the gravity of the crime and the interests of victims". Furthermore, even if an investigation has been initiated and there are substantial facts to warrant a prosecution and no other admissibility issues, the Prosecutor must determine whether a prosecution would serve the interests of justice "taking into account all the circumstances, including the gravity of the crime, the interests of victims and the age or infirmity of the alleged perpetrator, and his or her role in the alleged crime".

Individual criminal responsibility 
The Court has jurisdiction over natural persons. A person who commits a crime within the jurisdiction of the Court is individually responsible and liable for punishment in accordance with the Rome Statute. In accordance with the Rome Statute, a person shall be criminally responsible and liable for punishment for a crime within the jurisdiction of the Court if that person: Commits such a crime, whether as an individual, jointly with another or through another person, regardless of whether that other person is criminally responsible; Orders, solicits or induces the commission of such a crime which in fact occurs or is attempted; For the purpose of facilitating the commission of such a crime, aids, abets or otherwise assists in its commission or its attempted commission, including providing the means for its commission; In any other way contributes to the commission or attempted commission of such a crime by a group of persons acting with a common purpose. In respect of the crime of genocide, directly and publicly incites others to commit genocide; Attempts to commit such a crime by taking action that commences its execution by means of a substantial step, but the crime does not occur because of circumstances independent of the person's intentions

Procedure

Trial
Trials are conducted under a hybrid common law and civil law judicial system, but it has been argued the procedural orientation and character of the court is still evolving. A majority of the three judges present, as triers of fact in a bench trial, may reach a decision, which must include a full and reasoned statement. Trials are supposed to be public, but proceedings are often closed, and such exceptions to a public trial have not been enumerated in detail. In camera proceedings are allowed for protection of witnesses or defendants as well as for confidential or sensitive evidence. Hearsay and other indirect evidence is not generally prohibited, but it has been argued the court is guided by hearsay exceptions which are prominent in common law systems. There is no subpoena or other means to compel witnesses to come before the court, although the court has some power to compel testimony of those who chose to come before it, such as fines.

Rights of the accused
The Rome Statute provides that all persons are presumed innocent until proven guilty beyond reasonable doubt, and establishes certain rights of the accused and persons during investigations. These include the right to be fully informed of the charges against them; the right to have a lawyer appointed, free of charge; the right to a speedy trial; and the right to examine the witnesses against them.

To ensure "equality of arms" between defence and prosecution teams, the ICC has established an independent Office of Public Counsel for the Defence (OPCD) to provide logistical support, advice and information to defendants and their counsel. The OPCD also helps to safeguard the rights of the accused during the initial stages of an investigation. Thomas Lubanga's defence team said they were given a smaller budget than the Prosecutor and that evidence and witness statements were slow to arrive.

Victim participation
One of the great innovations of the Statute of the International Criminal Court and its Rules of Procedure and Evidence is the series of rights granted to victims. For the first time in the history of international criminal justice, victims have the possibility under the Statute to present their views and observations before the Court.

Participation before the Court may occur at various stages of proceedings and may take different forms, although it will be up to the judges to give directions as to the timing and manner of participation.

Participation in the Court's proceedings will in most cases take place through a legal representative and will be conducted "in a manner which is not prejudicial or inconsistent with the rights of the accused and a fair and impartial trial".

The victim-based provisions within the Rome Statute provide victims with the opportunity to have their voices heard and to obtain, where appropriate, some form of reparation for their suffering. It is the aim of this attempted balance between retributive and restorative justice that, it is hoped, will enable the ICC to not only bring criminals to justice but also help the victims themselves obtain some form of justice. Justice for victims before the ICC comprises both procedural and substantive justice, by allowing them to participate and present their views and interests, so that they can help to shape truth, justice and reparations outcomes of the Court.

Article 43(6) establishes a Victims and Witnesses Unit to provide "protective measures and security arrangements, counseling and other appropriate assistance for witnesses, victims who appear before the Court, and others who are at risk on account of testimony given by such witnesses." Article 68 sets out procedures for the "Protection of the victims and witnesses and their participation in the proceedings." The Court has also established an Office of Public Counsel for Victims, to provide support and assistance to victims and their legal representatives.

The ICC does not have its own witness protection program, but rather must rely on national programs to keep witnesses safe.

Reparations 
Victims before the International Criminal Court can also claim reparations under Article 75 of the Rome Statute. Reparations can only be claimed when a defendant is convicted and at the discretion of the Court's judges. So far the Court has ordered reparations against Thomas Lubanga. Reparations can include compensation, restitution and rehabilitation, but other forms of reparations may be appropriate for individual, collective or community victims. Article 79 of the Rome Statute establishes a Trust Fund to provide assistance before a reparation order to victims in a situation or to support reparations to victims and their families if the convicted person has no money.

Cooperation by states not party to Rome Statute
One of the principles of international law is that a treaty does not create either obligations or rights for third states without their consent, and this is also enshrined in the 1969 Vienna Convention on the Law of Treaties. The cooperation of the non-party states with the ICC is envisioned by the Rome Statute of the International Criminal Court to be of voluntary nature. States not acceded to the Rome Statute might still be subject to an obligation to cooperate with ICC in certain cases. When a case is referred to the ICC by the UN Security Council all UN member states are obliged to cooperate, since its decisions are binding for all of them. Also, there is an obligation to respect and ensure respect for international humanitarian law, which stems from the Geneva Conventions and Additional Protocol I, which reflects the absolute nature of international humanitarian law.

In relation to cooperation in investigation and evidence gathering, it is implied from the Rome Statute that the consent of a non-party state is a prerequisite for ICC Prosecutor to conduct an investigation within its territory, and it seems that it is even more necessary for him to observe any reasonable conditions raised by that state, since such restrictions exist for states party to the Statute. Taking into account the experience of the International Criminal Tribunal for the former Yugoslavia (which worked with the principle of the primacy, instead of complementarity) in relation to cooperation, some scholars have expressed their pessimism as to the possibility of ICC to obtain cooperation of non-party states. As for the actions that ICC can take toward non-party states that do not cooperate, the Rome Statute stipulates that the Court may inform the Assembly of States Parties or Security Council, when the matter was referred by it, when non-party state refuses to cooperate after it has entered into an ad hoc arrangement or an agreement with the Court.

Amnesty and national reconciliation processes
It is unclear to what extent the ICC is compatible with reconciliation processes that grant amnesty to human rights abusers as part of agreements to end conflict. Article 16 of the Rome Statute allows the Security Council to prevent the Court from investigating or prosecuting a case, and Article 53 allows the Prosecutor the discretion not to initiate an investigation if he or she believes that "an investigation would not serve the interests of justice". Former ICC president Philippe Kirsch has said that "some limited amnesties may be compatible" with a country's obligations genuinely to investigate or prosecute under the Statute.

It is sometimes argued that amnesties are necessary to allow the peaceful transfer of power from abusive regimes. By denying states the right to offer amnesty to human rights abusers, the International Criminal Court may make it more difficult to negotiate an end to conflict and a transition to democracy. For example, the outstanding arrest warrants for four leaders of the Lord's Resistance Army are regarded by some as an obstacle to ending the insurgency in Uganda. Czech politician Marek Benda argues that "the ICC as a deterrent will in our view only mean the worst dictators will try to retain power at all costs". The United Nations and the International Committee of the Red Cross maintain that granting amnesty to those accused of war crimes and other serious crimes is a violation of international law.

Facilities

Headquarters 

The official seat of the Court is in The Hague, Netherlands, but its proceedings may take place anywhere.

The Court moved into its first permanent premises in The Hague, located at Oude Waalsdorperweg 10, on 14 December 2015. Part of The Hague's International Zone, which also contains the Peace Palace, Europol, Eurojust, ICTY, OPCW and The Hague World Forum, the court facilities are situated on the site of the Alexanderkazerne, a former military barracks, adjacent to the dune landscape on the northern edge of the city. The ICC's detention centre is a short distance away.

Development 
The land and financing for the new construction were provided by the Netherlands. In addition, the host state organised and financed the architectural design competition which started at the end of 2008.

Three architects were chosen by an international jury from a total of 171 applicants to enter into further negotiations. The Danish firm schmidt hammer lassen were ultimately selected to design the new premises since its design met all the ICC criteria, such as design quality, sustainability, functionality and costs.

Demolition of the barracks started in November 2011 and was completed in August 2012. In October 2012 the tendering procedure for the General Contractor was completed and the combination Visser & Smit Bouw and Boele & van Eesteren ("Courtys") was selected.

Architecture 
The building has a compact footprint and consists of six connected building volumes with a garden motif. The tallest volume with a green facade, placed in the middle of the design, is the Court Tower that accommodates three courtrooms. The rest of the building's volumes accommodate the offices of the different organs of the ICC.

Provisional headquarters, 2002–2015 

Until late 2015, the ICC was housed in interim premises in The Hague provided by the Netherlands. Formerly belonging to KPN, the provisional headquarters were located at Maanweg 174 in the east-central portion of the city.

Detention centre 

The ICC's detention centre accommodates both those convicted by the court and serving sentences as well as those suspects detained pending the outcome of their trial. It comprises twelve cells on the premises of the Scheveningen branch of the Haaglanden Penal Institution, The Hague, close to the ICC's headquarters in the Alexanderkazerne.

Suspects held by the former International Criminal Tribunal for the former Yugoslavia were held in the same prison and shared some facilities, like the fitness room, but had no contact with suspects held by the ICC.

Other offices 
The ICC maintains a liaison office in New York and field offices in places where it conducts its activities. As of 18 October 2007, the Court had field offices in Kampala, Kinshasa, Bunia, Abéché and Bangui.

Finance

The ICC is financed by contributions from the states parties. The amount payable by each state party is determined using the same method as the United Nations: each state's contribution is based on the country's capacity to pay, which reflects factors such as a national income and population. The maximum amount a single country can pay in any year is limited to 22% of the Court's budget; Japan paid this amount in 2008.

The Court spent €80.5 million in 2007. The Assembly of States Parties approved a budget of €90.4 million for 2008, €101.2 million for 2009, and €141.6 million for 2017. , the ICC's staff consisted of 800 persons from approximately 100 states.

Trial history to date

To date, the Prosecutor has opened investigations in fourteen situations: Afghanistan; Burundi; two in the Central African Republic; Côte d'Ivoire; Darfur, Sudan; the Democratic Republic of the Congo; Georgia; Kenya; Libya; Mali; Uganda; Bangladesh/Myanmar, Palestine and Venezuela. Additionally, the Office of the Prosecutor is conducting preliminary examinations in six situations: Colombia; Guinea; Nigeria; the Philippines; Ukraine and Bolivia.

The Court's Pre-Trial Chambers have 

Thomas Lubanga, Germain Katanga and Mathieu Ngudjolo Chui were tried by the ICC. Lubanga and Katanga were convicted and sentenced to 14 and 12 years imprisonment, respectively, whereas Chui was acquitted.

The judgment of Jean-Pierre Bemba was rendered in March 2016. Bemba was convicted on two counts of crimes against humanity and three counts of war crimes. This marked the first time the ICC convicted someone of sexual violence as they added rape to his conviction. Bemba's convictions were overturned by the Court's Appeal Chamber in June 2018. The Court refused to compensate Bemba for losses suffered by him during his 10 years of imprisonment. It has been argued that this decision raises important questions about the court's present powers.  

Trials in the Ntaganda case (DR Congo), the Bemba et al.  case and the Laurent Gbagbo-Blé Goudé trial in the Côte d'Ivoire situation are ongoing. The Banda trial in the situation of Darfur, Sudan, was scheduled to begin in 2014 but the start date was vacated.

Charges against Ugandan Dominic Ongwen and Malian Ahmad al-Faqi al-Mahdi have been confirmed; as of March 2020 both were awaiting their trials.

On 6 July 2020, two Uyghur activist groups filed a complaint with the ICC calling for it to investigate PRC officials for crimes against Uyghurs, including allegations of genocide.

Investigations and preliminary examinations

Currently, the Office of the Prosecutor has 
Key:

Notes

Relationships

United Nations

Unlike the International Court of Justice, the ICC is legally independent from the United Nations. The Rome Statute grants certain powers to the United Nations Security Council, which limit its functional independence. Article 13 allows the Security Council to refer to the Court situations that would not otherwise fall under the Court's jurisdiction (as it did in relation to the situations in Darfur and Libya, which the Court could not otherwise have prosecuted as neither Sudan nor Libya are state parties). Article 16 allows the Security Council to require the Court to defer from investigating a case for a period of twelve months. Such a deferral may be renewed indefinitely by the Security Council. This sort of an arrangement gives the ICC some of the advantages inhering in the organs of the United Nations such as using the enforcement powers of the Security Council, but it also creates a risk of being tainted with the political controversies of the Security Council.

The Court cooperates with the UN in many different areas, including the exchange of information and logistical support. The Court reports to the UN each year on its activities, and some meetings of the Assembly of States Parties are held at UN facilities. The relationship between the Court and the UN is governed by a "Relationship Agreement between the International Criminal Court and the United Nations".

Nongovernmental organizations
During the 1970s and 1980s, international human rights and humanitarian Nongovernmental Organizations (or NGOs) began to proliferate at exponential rates. Concurrently, the quest to find a way to punish international crimes shifted from being the exclusive responsibility of legal experts to being shared with international human rights activism.

NGOs helped birth the ICC through advocacy and championing for the prosecution of perpetrators of crimes against humanity. NGOs closely monitor the organization's declarations and actions, ensuring that the work that is being executed on behalf of the ICC is fulfilling its objectives and responsibilities to civil society. According to Benjamin Schiff, "From the Statute Conference onward, the relationship between the ICC and the NGOs has probably been closer, more consistent, and more vital to the Court than have analogous relations between NGOs and any other international organization."

There are a number of NGOs working on a variety of issues related to the ICC. The NGO Coalition for the International Criminal Court has served as a sort of umbrella for NGOs to coordinate with each other on similar objectives related to the ICC. The CICC has 2,500 member organizations in 150 countries. The original steering committee included representatives from the World Federalist Movement, the International Commission of Jurists, Amnesty International, the Lawyers Committee for Human Rights, Human Rights Watch, Parliamentarians for Global Action, and No Peace Without Justice. Today, many of the NGOs with which the ICC cooperates are members of the CICC. These organizations come from a range of backgrounds, spanning from major international NGOs such as Human Rights Watch and Amnesty International, to smaller, more local organizations focused on peace and justice missions. Many work closely with states, such as the International Criminal Law Network, founded and predominantly funded by the Hague municipality and the Dutch Ministries of Defense and Foreign Affairs. The CICC also claims organizations that are themselves federations, such as the International Federation of Human Rights Leagues (FIDH).

CICC members subscribe to three principles that permit them to work under the umbrella of the CICC, so long as their objectives match them:
Promoting worldwide ratification and implementation of the Rome Statute of the ICC
Maintaining the integrity of the Rome Statute of the ICC, and
Ensuring the ICC will be as fair, effective and independent as possible

The NGOs that work under the CICC do not normally pursue agendas exclusive to the work of the Court, rather they may work for broader causes, such as general human rights issues, victims' rights, gender rights, rule of law, conflict mediation, and peace. The CICC coordinates their efforts to improve the efficiency of NGOs' contributions to the Court and to pool their influence on major common issues. From the ICC side, it has been useful to have the CICC channel NGO contacts with the Court so that its officials do not have to interact individually with thousands of separate organizations.

NGOs have been crucial to the evolution of the ICC, as they assisted in the creation of the normative climate that urged states to seriously consider the Court's formation. Their legal experts helped shape the Statute, while their lobbying efforts built support for it. They advocate Statute ratification globally and work at expert and political levels within member states for passage of necessary domestic legislation. NGOs are greatly represented at meetings for the Assembly of States Parties, and they use the ASP meetings to press for decisions promoting their priorities. Many of these NGOs have reasonable access to important officials at the ICC because of their involvement during the Statute process. They are engaged in monitoring, commenting upon, and assisting in the ICC's activities.

The ICC often depends on NGOs to interact with local populations. The Registry Public Information Office personnel and Victims Participation and Reparations Section officials hold seminars for local leaders, professionals and the media to spread the word about the Court. These are the kinds of events that are often hosted or organized by local NGOs. Because there can be challenges with determining which of these NGOs are legitimate, CICC regional representatives often have the ability to help screen and identify trustworthy organizations.

NGOs are also "sources of criticism, exhortation and pressure upon" the ICC. The ICC heavily depends on NGOs for its operations. Although NGOs and states cannot directly impact the judicial nucleus of the organization, they can impart information on crimes, can help locate victims and witnesses, and can promote and organize victim participation. NGOs outwardly comment on the Court's operations, "push for expansion of its activities especially in the new justice areas of outreach in conflict areas, in victims' participation and reparations, and in upholding due-process standards and defense 'equality of arms' and so implicitly set an agenda for the future evolution of the ICC." The relatively uninterrupted progression of NGO involvement with the ICC may mean that NGOs have become repositories of more institutional historical knowledge about the ICC than its national representatives, and have greater expertise than some of the organization's employees themselves. While NGOs look to mold the ICC to satisfy the interests and priorities that they have worked for since the early 1990s, they unavoidably press against the limits imposed upon the ICC by the states that are members of the organization. NGOs can pursue their own mandates, irrespective of whether they are compatible with those of other NGOs, while the ICC must respond to the complexities of its own mandate as well as those of the states and NGOs.

Another issue has been that NGOs possess "exaggerated senses of their ownership over the organization and, having been vital to and successful in promoting the Court, were not managing to redefine their roles to permit the Court its necessary independence." Additionally, because there does exist such a gap between the large human rights organizations and the smaller peace-oriented organizations, it is difficult for ICC officials to manage and gratify all of their NGOs. "ICC officials recognize that the NGOs pursue their own agendas, and that they will seek to pressure the ICC in the direction of their own priorities rather than necessarily understanding or being fully sympathetic to the myriad constraints and pressures under which the Court operates." Both the ICC and the NGO community avoid criticizing each other publicly or vehemently, although NGOs have released advisory and cautionary messages regarding the ICC. They avoid taking stances that could potentially give the Court's adversaries, particularly the U.S., more motive to berate the organization.

Criticisms

African accusations of Western imperialism

The ICC has been accused of bias and as being a tool of Western imperialism, only punishing leaders from small, weak states while ignoring crimes committed by richer and more powerful states. This sentiment has been expressed particularly by African leaders due to an alleged disproportionate focus of the Court on Africa, while it claims to have a global mandate; until January 2016, all nine situations which the ICC had been investigating were in African countries. 

African critics have suggested the ICC is acting as a neo-colonial force seeking to further empower Western political and extractive interests in Africa.”. Scholar Awol Allo has described the court's underlying problem that has led to these challenges with Africa as not overt racism, but Eurocentrism.

The prosecution of Kenyan Deputy President William Ruto and President Uhuru Kenyatta (both charged before coming into office) led to the Kenyan parliament passing a motion calling for Kenya's withdrawal from the ICC, and the country called on the other 33 African states party to the ICC to withdraw their support, an issue which was discussed at a special African Union (AU) summit in October 2013.

Though the ICC has denied the charge of disproportionately targeting African leaders, and claims to stand up for victims wherever they may be, Kenya was not alone in criticising the ICC. Sudanese President Omar al-Bashir visited Kenya, South Africa, China, Nigeria, Saudi Arabia, United Arab Emirates, Egypt, Ethiopia, Qatar and several other countries despite an outstanding ICC warrant for his arrest but was not arrested; he said that the charges against him are "exaggerated" and that the ICC was a part of a "Western plot" against him. Ivory Coast's government opted not to transfer former first lady Simone Gbagbo to the court but to instead try her at home. Rwanda's ambassador to the African Union, Joseph Nsengimana, argued that "It is not only the case of Kenya. We have seen international justice become more and more a political matter." Ugandan President Yoweri Museveni accused the ICC of "mishandling complex African issues". Ethiopian Prime Minister Hailemariam Desalegn, at the time AU chairman, told the UN General Assembly at the General debate of the sixty-eighth session of the United Nations General Assembly: "The manner in which the ICC has been operating has left a very bad impression in Africa. It is totally unacceptable."

African Union (AU) withdrawal proposal

South African President Jacob Zuma said the perceptions of the ICC as "unreasonable" led to the calling of the special AU summit on 13 October 2015. Botswana is a notable supporter of the ICC in Africa. At the summit, the AU did not endorse the proposal for a collective withdrawal from the ICC due to lack of support for the idea. The summit concluded that serving heads of state should not be put on trial and that the Kenyan cases should be deferred. Ethiopian formerly Foreign Minister Tedros Adhanom said: "We have rejected the double standard that the ICC is applying in dispensing international justice." Despite these calls, the ICC went ahead with requiring William Ruto to attend his trial. The UNSC was then asked to consider deferring the trials of Kenyatta and Ruto for a year, but this was rejected. In November, the ICC's Assembly of State Parties responded to Kenya's calls for an exemption for sitting heads of state by agreeing to consider amendments to the Rome Statute to address the concerns.

On 7 October 2016, Burundi announced that it would leave the ICC, after the court began investigating political violence in that nation. In the subsequent two weeks, South Africa and Gambia also announced their intention to leave the court, with Kenya and Namibia reportedly also considering departure. All three nations cited the fact that all 39 people indicted by the court over its history have been African and that the court has made no effort to investigate war crimes tied to the 2003 invasion of Iraq. Following Gambia's presidential election later that year, which ended the long rule of Yahya Jammeh, Gambia rescinded its withdrawal notification. The High Court of South Africa ruled on 2 February 2017 that the South African government's notice to withdraw was unconstitutional and invalid. On 7 March 2017 the South African government formally revoked its intention to withdraw. The ruling ANC revealed on 5 July 2017 that its intention to withdraw stands.

Supporters of criminalizing ecocide argue that it would shift the ICC's priorities away from Africa, since most environmental degradation is caused by States and corporations in the Global North.

United States government 
The United States Department of State argues that there are "insufficient checks and balances on the authority of the ICC prosecutor and judges" and "insufficient protection against politicized prosecutions or other abuses". The current law in the United States on the ICC is the American Service-Members' Protection Act (ASPA), 116 Stat. 820. The ASPA authorizes the President of the United States to use "all means necessary and appropriate to bring about the release of any U.S. or allied personnel being detained or imprisoned by, on behalf of, or at the request of the International Criminal Court". This authorization has led the act to be nicknamed the "Hague Invasion Act", because the freeing of U.S. citizens by force might be possible only through military action.

On 10 September 2018, John R. Bolton, in his first major address as U.S. National Security Advisor, reiterated that the ICC lacks checks and balances, exercises "jurisdiction over crimes that have disputed and ambiguous definitions", and has failed to "deter and punish atrocity crimes". The ICC, Bolton said, was "superfluous", given that "domestic judicial systems already hold American citizens to the highest legal and ethical standards". He added that the U.S. would do everything "to protect our citizens" should the ICC attempt to prosecute U.S. servicemen over alleged detainee abuse in Afghanistan. In that event, ICC judges and prosecutors would be barred from entering the U.S., their funds in the U.S. would be sanctioned and the U.S. "will prosecute them in the U.S. criminal system. We will do the same for any company or state that assists an ICC investigation of Americans", Bolton said. He also criticized Palestinian efforts to bring Israel before the ICC over allegations of human rights abuses in the West Bank and Gaza.

The ICC responded that it will continue to investigate war crimes undeterred.

On 11 June 2020, Mike Pompeo and U.S. President Donald Trump announced sanctions on officials and employees, as well as their families, involved in investigating alleged crimes against humanity committed by U.S. armed forces in Afghanistan. This move was widely criticized by human rights groups. The U.S. ordered sanctions against the ICC prosecutor Fatou Bensouda, and the ICC's head of Jurisdiction, Complementary, and Cooperation Division, Phakiso Mochochok, for an investigation into alleged war crimes by U.S. forces and the Central Intelligence Agency (CIA) in Afghanistan since 2003. The sanctions were subsequently lifted by Antony Blinken in April 2021.

OPCD 
Concerning the independent Office of Public Counsel for the Defence (OPCD), Thomas Lubanga's defence team say they were given a smaller budget than the Prosecutor and that evidence and witness statements were slow to arrive.

Impartiality
Human Rights Watch (HRW) reported that the ICC's prosecutor team takes no account of the roles played by the government in the conflict of Uganda, Rwanda or Congo. This led to a flawed investigation, because the ICC did not reach the conclusion of its verdict after considering the governments' position and actions in the conflict.

Unintentional consequences 
Research indicates that prosecutions of leaders who are culpable of international crimes in the ICC makes them less likely to peacefully step down, which can prolong conflicts and incentivize them to make continued use of mass violence. It is also argued that justice is a means to peace: "As a result, the ICC has been used as a means
of intervention in ongoing conflicts with the expectation that the indictments, arrests, and
trials of elite perpetrators have deterrence and preventive effects for atrocity crimes.
Despite these legitimate intentions and great expectations, there is little evidence of the
efficacy of justice as a means to peace".

State cooperation 
That the ICC cannot mount successful cases without state cooperation is problematic for several reasons. It means that the ICC acts inconsistently in its selection of cases, is prevented from taking on hard cases and loses legitimacy. It also gives the ICC less deterrent value, as potential perpetrators of war crimes know that they can avoid ICC judgment by taking over government and refusing to cooperate.

Principle of complementarity 
The fundamental principle of complementarity of the ICC Rome Statute is often taken for granted in the legal analysis of international criminal law and its jurisprudence. Initially the thorny issue of the actual application of the complementarity principle arose in 2008, when William Schabas published his influential paper. No substantive research was made by other scholars on this issue for quite some time. In June 2017, Victor Tsilonis advanced the same criticism which is reinforced by events, practices of the Office of the Prosecutor and ICC cases in the Essays in Honour of Nestor Courakis. His paper essentially argues that the Αl‐Senussi case arguably is the first instance of the complementarity principle's actual implementation eleven whole years after the ratification of the Rome Statute of the International Criminal Court.

On the other hand, in 2017, Chief Prosecutor Fatou Bensouda invoked the principle of complementarity in the situation between Russia and Georgia in the Ossetia region. Moreover, following the threats of certain African states (initially Burundi, Gambia and South Africa) to withdraw their ratifications, Bensouda again referred to the principle of complementarity as a core principle of ICC's jurisdiction and has more extensively focused on the principle's application on the latest Office of The Prosecutor's Report on Preliminary Examination Activities 2016.

Some advocates have suggested that the ICC go "beyond complementarity" and systematically support national capacity for prosecutions. They argue that national prosecutions, where possible, are more cost-effective, preferable to victims and more sustainable.

Jurisdiction over corporations
There is a debate on whether the ICC should have jurisdiction over corporations that violate international law. Supporters argue that corporations can and do commit human rights violations, such as war crimes linked to raw materials in conflict zones. Critics argue that prosecuting corporations would compromise the principle of complementarity, that it would give corporations excessive power under international law, or that it would compromise voluntary initiatives by companies. John Ruggie has argued that jurisdiction of corporations under international law should be limited to international crimes, while Nicolás Carrillo-Santarelli of La Sabana University argues that it should cover all human rights violations.

Despite its lack of jurisdiction, the ICC announced in 2016 that it would prioritize criminal cases linked to land grabbing, illegal resource extraction, or environmental degradation caused by corporate activity. The proposed crime of ecocide would have jurisdiction over corporations as well as governments.

See also
List of people indicted in the International Criminal Court
Agreement on the Privileges and Immunities of the International Criminal Court
Crimes against humanity
International Court of Justice
Legal Tools (database on International Criminal Law)
Rome Statute of the International Criminal Court
Rule of law
War crimes

References

Footnotes

General references

Further reading

 Archibugi, Daniele, Pease, Alice. Crime and Global Justice. The Dynamics of International Punishment, Polity Press, 2018, .
 Ba, Oumar. 2020. States of Justice: The Politics of the International Criminal Court. Cambridge University Press.
 Bosco, David. Rough Justice: The International Criminal Court's Battle to Fix the World, One Prosecution at a Time, Oxford University Press,  2014.
 Broomhall, Bruce. International Justice and the International Criminal Court: Between Sovereignty and the Rule of Law. Oxford: Oxford University Press (2003). .
 de Brouwer, Anne-Marie. Supranational Criminal Prosecution of Sexual Violence: The ICC and the Practice of the ICTY and the ICTR. Antwerp – Oxford: Intersentia (2005). .
 Calvo-Goller, Karin. The Trial Proceedings of the International Criminal Court – ICTY and ICTR Precedents, Martinus Nijhoff Publishers, 2006,.
 Calvo-Goller, Karin, La procédure et la jurisprudence de la Cour pénale internationale, (Preface by Pr Robert Badinter), Lextenso éditions – La Gazette du Palais, 2012,.
 Cassese, Antonio; Gaeta, Paola; Jones, John R.W.D. (eds.). The Rome Statute of the International Criminal Court: A Commentary. Oxford: Oxford University Press (2002). .
 Chappell, Louise, 'The Role of the ICC in Transitional Gender Justice: Capacity and Limitations' in Susanne Buckley-Zistel/Ruth Stanley (eds.): Gender in Transitional Justice, Palgrave, 2012, pp. 37–58.
 Köchler, Hans. Global Justice or Global Revenge? International Criminal Justice at the Crossroads. Vienna/New York: Springer, 2003, .
 Fichtelberg, Aaron. "Fair Trials and International Courts: A Critical Evaluation of the Nuremberg Legacy." Criminal Justice Ethics 28.1 (2009): 5–24.
 
 Kreicker, Helmut. Völkerrechtliche Exemtionen: Grundlagen und Grenzen völkerrechtlicher Immunitäten und ihre Wirkungen im Strafrecht. 2 vol., Berlin 2007, . See also 
 Lee, Roy S. (ed.). The International Criminal Court: The Making of the Rome Statute. The Hague: Kluwer Law International (1999). .
 Lee, Roy S.; Friman, Hakan (eds.). The International Criminal Court: Elements of Crimes and Rules of Procedure and Evidence. Ardsley, NY: Transnational Publishers (2001). .
 Luban, David, "America the Unaccountable", The New York Review of Books, vol. LXVII, no. 13 (20 August 2020), pp. 50–52. "At first the U.S. supported the idea [of a permanent international criminal court] and was actively involved in the 1998 Rome negotiations.  But the Pentagon feared that the ICC would be used politically against U.S. forces all over the world, and Washington turned against it." (p. 51.)
 Moffett, Luke. Justice for Victims before the International Criminal Court, Routledge (2014). .
 Morris, Madeline (ed.). "The United States and the International Criminal Court", Law and Contemporary Problems, Winter 2001, vol. 64, no. 1. Retrieved 2007-07-24.
 Roach, Steven C. (ed.). Governance, Order, and the International Criminal Court: Between Realpolitik and a Cosmopolitan Court. Oxford: Oxford University Press (2009). .
 Schabas, William A. An Introduction to the International Criminal Court (2nd ed.). Cambridge: Cambridge University Press (2004). .
 Schiff, Benjamin N. Building the International Criminal Court. Cambridge: Cambridge University Press (2008) 
 Strapatsas, Nicolaos. "Universal Jurisdiction and the International Criminal Court", Manitoba Law Journal, 2002, vol. 29, p. 2.
 Sunga, Lyal S. "The Crimes within the Jurisdiction of the International Criminal Court (Part II, Articles 5–10)", European Journal of Crime, Criminal Law and Criminal Justice vol. 6, no. 4, pp. 377–399 (April 1998).
 Sunga, Lyal S. "The Emerging System of International Criminal Law: Developments in Codification and Implementation" (Brill) (1997).
 Averting Palestinian Unilateralism: The International Criminal Court and the Recognition of the Palestinian Authority as a Palestinian State, Ambassador Dore Gold with Diane Morrison, October 2010.

External links

 
 The States Parties to the Rome Statute
 United Nations website on the Rome Statute

 
2002 establishments in the Netherlands
Courts and tribunals established in 2002
Organisations based in The Hague
United Nations General Assembly observers
International courts and tribunals